The H. C. Ørsted Medal is a medal for scientific achievement awarded by the Danish Selskabet for naturlærens udbredelse (The Society for the Dissemination of Natural Science). Named for the society's founder Hans Christian Ørsted, it is awarded chiefly to Danes. The medal is awarded in three versions: gold is for outstanding original scientific work in physics or chemistry published during the previous year; silver is for outstanding writing of science for a popular audience over several years; and bronze is for outstanding popularization of science through non-written methods, such as in museums or through business.

Recipients

Gold
Source: naturlæren.dk
2019 Karl Anker Jørgensen
1989 Thor A. Bak
1977 Kai Arne Jensen
1974 Jens Lindhard
1970 Christian Møller
1970 Aage Bohr
1965 Bengt Strömgren
1959 Jens Anton Christiansen
1959 Paul Bergsøe
1952 Alex Langseth
1941 Kaj Linderstrøm-Lang
1928 Peder Oluf Pedersen
1928 Niels Bjerrum
1928 Johannes Nicolaus Brønsted
1924 Niels Bohr
1916 Martin Knudsen
1912 Christian Christiansen
1909 S.P.L. Sørensen

Silver
Source:  naturlæren.dk
2020 Jens Ramskov
2019 Thomas Bolander
2016 Anja Cetti Andersen
2000 Jens Martin Knudsen
1999 Ove Nathan
1991 Niels Ove Lassen
1990 Jens J. Kjærgaard
1988 Niels Blædel
1980 K.G. Hansen

Bronze
Source: naturlæren.dk
2020 Stefan Emil Lemser Eychenne
2020 Claus Rintza
2020 Lasse Seidelin Bendtsen
2019 Michael Lentfer Jensen
2019 Jeannette Overgaard Tejlmann Madsen
2018 Ole Bakander
2017 Bjarning Grøn
2016 Martin Frøhling Jensen
2015 Henrik Parbo
2014 Pia Halkjær Gommesen
2013 Niels Christian Hartling
2013 Peter Arnborg Videsen
2012 Jannik Johansen (scientist)
2006 Finn Berg Rasmussen
2004 Erik Schou Jensen
2003 Ryan Holm
2001 Asger Høeg

See also

 List of chemistry awards
 List of physics awards

External links
 Selskabet for naturlærens udbredelse

Chemistry awards
Danish science and technology awards
Physics awards
Science writing awards
Science communication awards